AM5 can refer to:
 Socket AM5, a CPU socket for AMD processors
 Sega AM5, a video game development studio